Consent within BDSM is when a participant gives their permission for certain acts or types of relationships. It bears much in common with the concept of informed consent and is simultaneously a personal, ethical and social issue. It is an issue that attracts much attention within BDSM, resulting in competing models of consent such as safe, sane and consensual and risk-aware consensual kink. Observers from outside the BDSM community have also commented on the issue of consent in BDSM, sometimes referring to legal consent which is a separate and largely unrelated matter. However, the presence of explicit consent within BDSM can often have implications for BDSM and the law and, depending on the country the participants are in, may make the differences between being prosecuted or not.

Where an act has been previously consented to, the consent can be terminated at any point, and by any participant, through using a safeword. Within the BDSM community, it is generally considered a high risk activity to engage in BDSM without a safeword. Acts undertaken with a lack of explicit consent may be considered abusive and those who ignore the use of a safeword may be shunned within the BDSM subculture. One study has shown that BDSM negotiations to establish consent consist of four parts covering style of play, body parts, limits and safewords.

Concept 
Consent is an explicit agreement to acts, terms and conditions. It can be confirmed verbally and/or in writing. 

The underlying principle is a classical liberal idea that a person's freedom can be measured by lack of interference with their personal choices. As in classical liberalism, the harm principle comes into play. Consent, within BDSM and some academic schools of thought, is what separates legally actionable harm from legitimate personal freedom. 

Informed consent is the idea that consent is offered with sufficient information and understanding of what is being agreed upon. As in larger society, an impairment of mental state or decision making abilities is considered a state in which informed, rational consent cannot be offered. Consent given under coercion and pressure may also not be accepted.

Another concept is contemporaneous consent, which is focused on when consent is offered and how it can be revoked. Legally, if someone says "no", "stop", or any other related things, you are obligated to stop. That is contemporaneous consent. This can conflict with concepts like total power exchange and consensual nonconsent. This is an area of significant conflict within BDSM communities.

Scope 
Consent is a vital element in all psychological play, and consent can be granted in many ways. Some employ a written form known as a "Dungeon negotiation form"; for others a simple verbal commitment is sufficient. Consent can be limited both in duration and content.

Temporary consent 
It is not unusual to grant consent only for an hour or for an evening. When a scene lasts for more than a few hours, some might decide to draft a "scene contract" that defines what will happen and who is responsible for what. Some "contracts" can become quite detailed and run for many pages, especially if a scene is to last a weekend or more.

Indefinite and long term consent 
For long term consent, a "Slave Contract" is sometimes used. BDSM "contracts" are only agreements between consenting adults and are not legally binding; in fact, the possession of one may be considered illegal in some areas. Slave contracts are simply a way of defining the nature and limits of the relationship. Other couples know each other's likes and dislikes and play accordingly. Such arrangements typically use a safeword, a signal by one or more of the participants that the action in question should either stop or that the session should end completely.

Consensual non-consent 
Consensual non-consent, also called meta-consent and blanket consent, is a mutual agreement to be able to act as if consent has been waived. It is an agreement where comprehensive consent is given in advance, with the intent of it being irrevocable under most circumstances. This often occurs without foreknowledge of the exact actions planned.

Consensual non-consent is considered a show of extreme trust and understanding. It is controversial within BDSM circles, even often frowned upon due to concerns about abuse and safety. It is mainly limited to those in Master/slave relationships. 

In recent years, the term has also been used for the practice in play sessions. In the past, the term consensual non-consent was reserved to committed relationships, while the play practice used the umbrella term of edge play. This expanded scope is contentious and the subject of acrimonious debates.

In limited parts of the online BDSM community, "consensual non-consent" is instead used to refer to rape play that includes the use of safe words. This use of the term is commonly frowned upon, especially among total power exchange lifestyle participants. Experienced practitioners of BDSM generally discourage others from using "consensual non-consent" to indicate rape play. This attitude arises from the belief that it is a miscommunication potentially leading to serious and irreparable psychological harm.

Negotiation 

Negotiation is a discussion about what is acceptable and what is off limits between partners. It is a crucial element for consent within the BDSM subculture. Negotiation can be formal with a complete checklist of acceptable and unacceptable acts. It can also be informal, or ad hoc, as part of the regular flow of a relationship. The culture of BDSM encourages a more formalized and explicit process. Clear negotiation for consent is the norm.

Informal negotiation is the process of discovering limits and interests along the way. Things are up for discussion and consent is granted on a case-by-case basis. However, over time the consent granted typically becomes broader before hitting a plateau. Negotiation in this sense resembles regular vanilla relationship discussions and debates.

Formal negotiation goes through a comprehensive list of questions and disclosures. This can be a broad process, setting out the boundaries for a long-term relationship. It can also be a narrow process that only addresses one or two specific actions, like negotiating for hypnotic trance or a thuddy flogging (that involving broad implements). This is fairly popular with play partner arrangements and "pick up" play in BDSM clubs, as it helps set very clear boundaries.

Models and philosophy

BDSM communities share a common language of consent. Various models are expressed as acronyms representing differing approaches towards a philosophy of consent.

SSC 

SSC stands for Safe, Sane, Consensual. It is far and away the most recognizable and popular model of consent in BDSM circles, though not without criticism.

RACK 

RACK stands for Risk-Aware Consensual Kink. It is the second most popular consent model. It was created to overcome perceived shortcomings of SSC.

PRICK 

PRICK stands for Personal Responsibility In Consensual Kink. It is an alternative to RACK that emphasizes personal responsibility for choices and consequences.  It originally was said in 2002 at BDSM Overdrive.  It has evolved into Personal Responsibility Informed Consensual Kink.

Other models 
Other less well known models of consent in BDSM include CCC, which stands for Committed, Compassionate, Consensual and the 4 C's — Caring, Communication, Consent, Caution.

Legal aspects
Some activities in BDSM play may be considered to fall under legal definitions of rape, assault or similar crimes or torts, and potentially open participants to prosecution. However, many legal systems include a general defense that activities performed with the victim's consent shall not be considered a crime or a tort. This raises some legal and ethical issues, such as:

 What is consent?
 Who can express consent? (For example: children are typically not considered to be able to give consent to sex.)
 When do we define consent as given?
 When is given consent invalidated?
 And are there activities that we still cannot allow, even with the victim's consent?

These concerns apply not only to BDSM but to every kind of interaction between persons. See Consent (criminal) for the general discussion.

The issue of consent in BDSM has caused a controversy among the BDSM community in some countries, since certain activities, especially those considered to be edgeplay, remain unlawful even when consent has been freely given. In such countries, these activities will always be viewed by law enforcement as unlawful when discovered, even though the activities have been entirely private. The Spanner case in England demonstrates the point, where participants in a consensual mutual BDSM play party were arrested. At all stages of appeal the national and European Court ruled against them on the basis that a person under English law may not give consent to anything more than minor injury. 

The March 5, 2007 conviction of Glenn Marcus on counts of sex trafficking and forced labor in renewed much debate on the issue of consent in BDSM, both within and outside the community. In a similar case of an accusation made by a participant that the activities had not been consensual, in April 2007 two UK men were convicted of false imprisonment in a case where a third party who had been treated like a dog asserted the matter had not been consensual. 

Interested people may think that private mutual activities should not be the subject of law as a matter of public policy, a view which has some legal backing in the United States from the case of Lawrence v. Texas where it was effectively ruled that the state lacked the power to declare an activity illegal purely on the basis of moral opinion. As of February 2019, the law in the UK has been changed to allow for consent to acts that inflict injury.

See also
 Glossary of BDSM terms
 Limits
 Negotiation
 Safeword
 Scene

References

Autonomy
BDSM terminology
Consent
Sexual ethics
Sexual misconduct